is a passenger railway station located in the city of Koshigaya, Saitama, Japan, operated by the private railway operator Tōbu Railway.

Lines
Through services also operate to and from  via the Tokyo Metro Hibiya Line and  via the Tokyo Metro Hanzomon Line. It is also located adjacent to Minami-Koshigaya Station on the Musashino Line.

Station layout
The elevated station consists of a five-story station building with two island platforms serving four tracks on the 4th floor level.

Platforms

Adjacent stations

History
The station opened on 23 July 1974. From 17 March 2012, station numbering was introduced on all Tobu lines, with Shin-Koshigaya Station becoming "TS-20".

Future developments
Chest-high platform edge doors are scheduled to be added by the end of fiscal 2020.

Passenger statistics
In fiscal 2019, the station was used by an average of 151,316 passengers daily.

Surrounding area
 Minami-Koshigaya Station (Musashino Line)
 Saitama Toho Junior College
 Koshigaya Freight Terminal
 Dokkyo Medical University Koshigaya Hospital

See also
 List of railway stations in Japan

References

External links

  

Railway stations in Japan opened in 1974
Railway stations in Saitama Prefecture
Tobu Skytree Line
Stations of Tobu Railway
Koshigaya, Saitama